A stew is a combination of food ingredients cooked in liquid.

Stew may also refer to:

People
Stew (musician), singer/songwriter/playwright and member of the band The Negro Problem 
 Stewart Stew Albert (1939–2006), anti-Vietnam War activist and co-founder of the Yippies
 Stewart Stew Barber (born 1939), former American Football League player and executive
 Stewart Stew Bolen (1902-1969), American Major League Baseball pitcher
 Stewart Stew Bowers (1915-2005), American Major League Baseball pitcher
 Stewart Stew Cliburn (born 1956), American former Major League Baseball pitcher
 Stewart Stew Hofferth (1913-1994), American Major League Baseball catcher
 Stewart Stew Johnson (born 1944), former American Basketball Association player
 Stew Leonard, Jr., president and CEO of the Stew Leonard's American supermarket chain
 Stewart Stew Morrill (born 1952), American college basketball coach

Other uses
 Stew, a medieval term for a brothel
 Stew, another name for a rookery (slum)
 Stew Leonard's, a family-owned American retail chain that includes grocery stores and wineries
 Stew pond, or stew, a pond used for keeping live fish

See also
Stewart (disambiguation)
Stu